In mathematics, the lowest common denominator or least common denominator (abbreviated LCD) is the lowest common multiple of the denominators of a set of fractions. It simplifies adding, subtracting, and comparing fractions.

Description 
The lowest common denominator of a set of fractions is the lowest number that is a multiple of all the denominators: their lowest common multiple. 
The product of the denominators is always a common denominator, as in:

 

but it is not always the lowest common denominator, as in:

 

Here, 36 is the least common multiple of 12 and 18. Their product, 216, is also a common denominator, but calculating with that denominator involves larger numbers:
 

With variables rather than numbers, the same principles apply:

 

Role in arithmetic and algebra 
The same fraction can be expressed in many different forms. As long as the ratio between numerator and denominator is the same, the fractions represent the same number. For example:

 
because they are all multiplied by 1 written as a fraction:
 

It is usually easiest to add, subtract, or compare fractions when each is expressed with the same denominator, called a "common denominator". For example, the numerators of fractions with common denominators can simply be added, such that  and that , since each fraction has the common denominator 12. Any common denominator will do, but usually the lowest common denominator is desirable because it makes the rest of the calculation as simple as possible.

Practical uses
The LCD has many practical uses, such as determining the number of objects of two different lengths necessary to align them in a row which starts and ends at the same place, such as in brickwork, tiling, and tessellation. It is also useful in planning work schedules with employees with y days off every x days.

In musical rhythm, the LCD is used in cross-rhythms and polymeters to determine the fewest notes necessary to count time given two or more metric divisions. For example, much African music is recorded in Western notation using  because each measure is divided by 4 and by 3, the LCD of which is 12.

Colloquial usage 
The expression "lowest common denominator" is used to describe (usually in a disapproving manner) a rule, proposal, opinion, or media that is deliberately simplified so as to appeal to the largest possible number of people.

See also 
 Anomalous cancellation
 Greatest common divisor
 Partial fraction decomposition, reverses the process of adding fractions into uncommon denominators

References 

Elementary arithmetic
Fractions (mathematics)